Samet Ak (born 21 July 2001) is a Turkish recurve archer.

Sport career
Samet Ak won the gold medal in the men's team recurve event at the 2019 Archery World Cup held in Berlin, Germany.

References

Turkish male archers
Living people
2001 births
Archers at the 2018 Summer Youth Olympics
Competitors at the 2022 Mediterranean Games
Mediterranean Games bronze medalists for Turkey
Mediterranean Games medalists in archery
21st-century Turkish people
Islamic Solidarity Games medalists in archery